The 1938 Australian Track Cycling Championships were held in Melbourne from 15 to 20 December 1937. The decision to hold the 1938 championships in 1937 came as a surprise to many, including the Queensland Amateur Cyclists Union. The Championships also doubled as the trials for the 1938 British Empire Games.

Healing Shield Winners: Victoria

References 

1938 British Empire Games
Australian Track Cycling Championships
1938 in Australian sport
1938 in track cycling